The 1891 Sewanee Tigers football team represented the Sewanee Tigers of Sewanee: The University of the South during the 1891 college football season.  In the inaugural season of Sewanee football, the Tigers compiled a 1–2 record. The team's quarterback was Ellwood Wilson, considered the "founder of Sewanee football." He had come from Lawrenceville, New Jersey, where he played football before, to Sewanee in 1889. While introducing the sport to Sewanee, he was forced to use a piece of wood shaped like a football until he found a real one. Sewanee's first intercollegiate game was the first instance of the Sewanee–Vanderbilt rivalry and Vanderbilt's second ever game.  The win over Tennessee was that program's first game.

Schedule

References

Sewanee
Sewanee Tigers football seasons
Sewanee Tigers football